York-Gordon House, more accurately known as the Patrick and Mary Gordon house, is a historic dwelling located at New Bern, Craven County, North Carolina.  It was built in 1771, as documented by a letter from Patrick Gordon to William Hooper. Early title research suggested that the house was much older and belonged to Susan York; she evidently lived in an earlier house on this site; her house was probably destroyed in the great storm of 1769.  The 1771 house is a -story, five bay, frame dwelling with a gambrel roof and Georgian style design elements. A Federal chimneypiece replaced an earlier  Georgian chimneypiece in the early 19 century. The house is sheathed in shiplap siding over brick-filled walls, rests on a brick over ballast stone foundation and features a full-width, one-story shed-roof porch, which was added 1786, based on estate records.

It was listed on the National Register of Historic Places in 1973.

References

Houses on the National Register of Historic Places in North Carolina
Georgian architecture in North Carolina
Federal architecture in North Carolina
Houses completed in 1768
Houses in New Bern, North Carolina
National Register of Historic Places in Craven County, North Carolina
1768 establishments in North Carolina